Chaetocneme is genus of skipper butterflies in the family Hesperiidae. 

The genus was established in 1860 with "Chaetocneme corvus" – then newly described as it was believed – as the type species. However, the same species was already described by Pieter Cramer in 1775 under the name "Papilio helirius". Thus, the type species is nowadays called Chaetocneme helirius.

Selected species
 Chaetocneme beata
 Chaetocneme denitza
 Chaetocneme helirius

Hesperiidae
Hesperiidae genera